Palpita aethrophanes is a moth in the family Crambidae. It is found in the Democratic Republic of Congo (North Kivu).

References

Moths described in 1934
Palpita
Moths of Africa